Verdure may refer to:
Heath
La Verdure River
Vegetation
Tapestries with landscape subjects